is a Japanese professional wrestler currently working as a freelancer and is best known for her tenures with Marvelous That's Women Pro Wrestling and Pro Wrestling Wave.

Professional wrestling career

Independent circuit (2018–present)
Hoshizuki is known for competing in various promotions from the Japanese independent scene. At a house show of World Woman Pro-Wrestling Diana from September 1, 2019, she teamed up with Tomoko Watanabe in a losing effort against Crysis (Jaguar Yokota and Megumi Yabushita). At SEAdLINNNG Sparkling-d! 2019, an event promoted by Seadlinnng on October 6, she teamed up with Mei Suruga and unsuccessfully challenged Hiroyo Matsumoto and Yoshiko for the Beyond the Sea Tag Team Championship. At a house show produced by Pro Wrestling Wave on December 25, 2019, Hoshizuki teamed up with Ayumi Hayashi and Himeka Arita to defeat Haruka Umesaki, Misa Matsui and Rina Shingaki. At WAVE Saturday Night Fever 2021 from July 24, she teamed up with Ami Miura to defeat Chie Ozora and Momo Kohgo.

Marvelous That's Women Pro Wrestling (2018–2021)
Hoshizuki made her professional wrestling debut in Marvelous That's Women Pro Wrestling at a house show from November 18, 2018, where she fell short to Tomoko Watanabe in singles competition. On the second anniversary of her debut, Hoshizuki defeated Maria and Mikoto Shindo in a three-way match. During her time in the promotion, she competed in various independent events as a Marvelous representative. At GAEAism Decade Of Quarter Century, an independent event which marked 25 years from the foundin of Gaea Japan promoted on June 13, 2021, she competed in a all rights six-woman elimination tag team match in which she teamed up with Mio Momono and Rin Kadokura and fell short to Team Sendai Girls (Chihiro Hashimoto, Dash Chisako and Mika Iwata). At stake were the vacant AAAW Single Championship, AAAW Tag Team Championship, and Hashimoto's Sendai Girls World Championship and one half of her Sendai Girls Tag Team Championship. On August 31, 2021, it was reported that Hoshizuki with Mikoto Shindo and Hibiki have left Marvelous. Hoshizuki has been inactive in professional wrestling ever since.

Sendai Girls' Pro Wrestling (2019–2021)
Hoshizuki has had a brief tenure with Sendai Girls' Pro Wrestling. She won the 2020 edition of the Jaja Uma tournament by defeating Maria in the first rounds, Yurika Oka in the second, Mikoto Shindo in the semifinals and Manami in the finals from September 22 which took place at the Sendai Girls Burning UP! event. At Sendai Girls KICK Revived  on November 22, 2020, she defeated Manami to win the Sendai Girls Junior Championship. At Sendai Girls Road To GAEAism on October 1, 2021, due to being a Marvelous roster member, Hoshizuki teamed up with promotion mates Hibiki, Maria, Masha Slamovich, Mikoto Shindo, Mio Momono and Rin Kadokura to defeat "Team Sendai" (Chihiro Hashimoto, Dash Chisako, Kanon, Manami, Mika Iwata, Natsuho Kaneko and Yurika Oka).

World Wonder Ring Stardom (2020–2021)
Hoshizuki made her debut in World Wonder Ring Stardom on the ninth night of the 2020 5Star Grand Prix from September 28, where she teamed up with New-Tra (Rin Kadokura and Takumi Iroha) to defeat Queen's Quest (AZM, Momo Watanabe and Utami Hayashishita) in a six-woman tag team match. At Stardom Osaka Dream Cinderella 2020 on December 20, Hoshizuki unsuccessfully challenged AZM for the High Speed Championship. At Stardom All Star Dream Cinderella on March 3, 2021, she competed in a 24-women Stardom All Star Rumble won by Unagi Sayaka and also involving wrestler's from the promotion's past such as Yuzuki Aikawa, Chigusa Nagayo, Kyoko Inoue, Miho Wakizawa or Mima Shimoda, and from the present like Bea Priestley, Mina Shirakawa, and the most majority of the current roster of the promotion at the time.

Championships and accomplishments
Sendai Girls' Pro Wrestling
Sendai Girls Junior Championship (1 time)
Jaja Uma Tournament (2020)

References

2002 births
Living people
Japanese female professional wrestlers
21st-century professional wrestlers
People from Shizuoka Prefecture
Sportspeople from Shizuoka Prefecture